was a Japanese actor and voice actor. He is best known for his voice-over portrayal of Professor Ochanomizu in three anime adaptations of the Astro Boy franchise, and also voiced Dr. Hoshi in Astroganger (1972–1973), Professor Tobishima in Groizer X (1976–1977), and Shin'ichirō Izumi in Tōshō Daimos (1978–1979).

Early life
Hisashi Katsuta was born on 2 April 1927 in Tokyo, and was educated at Seigakuin Junior & Senior High School and the Technical Institute for Wireless-Communications (now the University of Electro-Communications).

He had been interested in film and theater since childhood, and he and his elder brother would often see films. He graduated from the  Faculty of Theatre in 1949.
Rindō Pro, Tokyo Actor's Consumer's Cooperative Society, and Arts Vision.

Voice acting career
His voice acting career started in 1948 when he appeared in NHK's 1948 radio adaptation of the Shi Nai'an novel Water Margin, and he was contracted to the broadcaster in 1949 before being released in 1954. Katsuta would later become a pioneer in voice acting in Japan. He started dubbing work with the Japanese dub of The Buccaneers, a television drama produced in the United Kingdom in 1956. He later cited Surfside 6 and The Beverly Hillbillies, both American live-action shows in the 1960s, as two of his most memorable dubbing works.

In 1963, he was cast as Dr. Ochanomizu in the anime Astro Boy. The Ochanomizu character would become Katsuta's own magnum opus, and he would later reprise his role in both the 1980 and 2003 anime adaptations of Astro Boy, as well as the film adaptations Hero of Space and Shinsengumi.

In addition to Dr. Ochanomizu, he also voiced Dr. Hoshi in Astroganger, Professor Tobishima in Groizer X, and Shin'ichirō Izumi in Tōshō Daimos. In 1979, Katsuta voiced the fictional depiction of King Louis XV of France in The Rose of Versailles and a fictional depiction of the Sengoku-era samurai Sanada Yukimura in Manga Sarutobi Sasuke. He had minor roles in several anime series, including Cat's Eye, Dororo, Jetter Mars, Katri, Girl of the Meadows, Kimba the White Lion, Legend of the Galactic Heroes, Marine Boy, Megazone 23, Musashi no Ken, Oishinbo, Perman, Shin Jungle Taitei: Susume Leo!, The Monster Kid, and Voltes V.

He later published a book on voice acting, and later credited the fact that voice acting in Japan has a history as his reason for authoring the book. He also published , an autobiography that feature thirty-two voice actors with a prominent impact on Japanese culture.
He was one of three winners of the Synergy Award at the 3rd Seiyu Awards on 7 March 2009.

Death
Katsuta died of senility on 21 February 2020, at the age of 92 in a hospital in Ōme, Tokyo; he was survived by his wife .

Filmography

Animation
1963
Astro Boy, Professor Ochanomizu
1965
Kimba the White Lion, Mandi
1967
Perman, Mantarō Suwa
1968
, at least sixteen minor characters
, narrator
1969
Dororo, Shinsuke
Marine Boy, boss, subordinate
Ninpū Kamui Gaiden, Shoya
1970
Bakuhatsu Gorō, Aozora Gakuen Principal
1971
, Sōsaku Suzuki
1972
Astroganger, Dr. Hoshi
, Papa
1975
Don Chuck Monogatari
1976
3000 Leagues in Search of Mother, Fosco
Groizer X, Professor Tobishima
1977
Jetter Mars, Dr. Kawashimo
Lupin the Third Part II, Los Angeles Police Station Chief
Voltes V, General Dange
Yakyū-kyō no Uta, Owner
1978
, Edo
Tōshō Daimos, Shin'ichirō Izumi
1979
Manga Sarutobi Sasuke, Sanada Yukimura
The Rose of Versailles, Louis XV of France
Undersea Super Train: Marine Express, Dr. Narzonkopf
1980
Astro Boy, Professor Ochanomizu
1983
Cat's Eye, Director Takeoka
1984
Katri, Girl of the Meadows, Elias Lilack
Lupin III Part III, Count Goan
1985
Musashi no Ken, Ueda-sensei
1988
Oishinbo, Chairman Futaki
1990
, Takuwan Taoist
2003
Astro Boy, Professor Ochanomizu

Film
1982
The Monster Kid: Demon Sword, President of Akumajuku

Dubbing
ER, Dr. Jim McNulty (Ed Asner)
Friends, Roy (Danny DeVito)
The Great Escape (1971 Fuji TV edition), Flight Lieutenant Colin Blythe (Donald Pleasence)

References

External links

1927 births
2020 deaths
Arts Vision voice actors
Japanese educators
Japanese male voice actors
Male voice actors from Tokyo Metropolis
Tokyo Actor's Consumer's Cooperative Society voice actors
University of Electro-Communications alumni